Football has been a sport at the National Games of India since the 1985 edition, while the Women's football tournament was introduced in the 1999 edition. The 1985 National Games was the first modern National Games to be held since its inception in 1924 and was also the first to be held on the lines of the Olympics. Punjab and West Bengal are currently the most successful states in the Men's event with 3 Gold Medals each while Manipur is the most successful in Women's event with 5 Gold Medals.

At the 2022 edition, West Bengal won its third gold medal in the men's event while Manipur won its fifth gold medal in the women's event.

Results

Men's tournament

Women's tournament

Medal table

Men's medal table

Women's medal table

See also
 Santosh Trophy
 Senior Women's National Football Championship

References

 
Football competitions in India
Indian National Games